InNexus Biotechnology, Inc.. was a drug company based in British Columbia, Canada.  InNexus was founded in 2001 and became a publicly traded corporation in 2003 on the TSX Venture Exchange.  On 2009-12-30, the company filed a Form 15-F with the U.S. Securities and Exchange Commission (SEC) to voluntarily deregister its common stock under the Securities Exchange Act of 1934 and continue its primary listing on the TSX Venture Exchange under the symbol of IXS; it is no longer listed on the TSX Venture Exchange.  IXS was developing what they refer to as DXLA- or DXL-modified antibodies, wherein certain autophilic peptides are integrated with a monoclonal antibody.  The DXL-modified antibodies have been shown to have enhanced binding affinity and, as a potential result, greater potency for use as a therapy to fight cancer and higher signal strength for use as a diagnostic for detecting cancer versus an unmodified antibody.

References
"InNexus Biotechnology Announces Preliminary Results of Animal Study Comparing Cancer Killing Activity of Its DXL625 (CD20) Treatment for Non-Hodgkin's Lymphoma With Leading Marketed Product", Reuters, February 7, 2008, Accessed January 3, 2010.'''
"InNexus Named to TSX Venture Top 50". Accessed January 3, 2010
TSX Venture Exchange Official Website, May 31, 2007, Accessed January 3, 2010.
"Momentum Builds in Valley's Cancer Research Efforts", Phoenix Business Journal, November 23, 2007, Accessed January 3, 2010.

Companies listed on the NEX Exchange
Biotechnology companies of Canada
Companies based in British Columbia
Companies established in 2001